Dawn Patrol is a World War I combat flight simulator by Rowan Software. It was released in 1994 for Amiga and MS-DOS. The game's front end takes the form of a hyperlinked book describing the history of the war in the air, the aircraft, and some of the famous aces who flew them, with each page featuring a mission directly related to the subject. The player may choose to fly each mission on the side of the British Royal Flying Corps or the German Air Service, flying many early fighter aircraft such as the SE5a and Fokker Dr.I featured on the box illustration. The Amiga version came with a book called Richthofen: The man and the aircraft he flew. Amiga Computing gave the game a rating of 88%.

Dawn Patrol: Head to Head was released in 1995 by Rowan Software as an improved version of Dawn Patrol and additionally featured one-on-one dogfighting via serial modem connection.

Flying Corps also by Rowan Software (working title: Dawn Patrol 2) was the unofficial successor to Dawn Patrol and Dawn Patrol: Head to Head.

Reception

References

External links

Dawn Patrol and Dawn Patrol: Head to Head at Wings of Honor - Where Combat Simulation Begins!

1994 video games
Amiga games
DOS games
Combat flight simulators
World War I flight simulation video games
Video games developed in the United Kingdom
World War I video games
Empire Interactive games
Rowan Software games
Single-player video games